Solveig Sollie (born 19 April 1939) is a Norwegian politician for the Christian People's Party, who served as parliamentary representative for Telemark 1985–1993. She was also Minister of Administration and Consumer Affairs (consumer affairs) in 1989, and Minister of Family and Consumer Affairs in 1990. From 1998-2004, she served as the County Governor of Telemark.

References

1939 births
Living people
Government ministers of Norway
Ministers of Children, Equality and Social Inclusion of Norway
Members of the Storting
Christian Democratic Party (Norway) politicians
20th-century Norwegian politicians
County governors of Norway